This is a list of the busiest airports in Spain, including airports in the Balearic Islands and the Canary Islands. Data is compiled from statistics published by ENAIRE (formerly AENA), the public body that owns and operates the majority of airports in the country.

At a glance

30 busiest airports in Spain by passenger traffic

2019 

The following is a list of the 30 busiest Spanish airports in 2019, from provisional AENA statistics.

2018 

The following is a list of the 30 busiest Spanish airports in 2018, from provisional AENA statistics.

2017 

The following is a list of the 30 busiest Spanish airports in 2017, from provisional AENA statistics.

2016 

The following is a list of the 30 busiest Spanish airports in 2016, from AENA statistics.

2015 

The following is a list of the 30 busiest Spanish airports in 2015, from final AENA statistics.

2014

The following is a list of the 30 busiest Spanish airports in 2014, from AENA statistics.

2013

The following is a list of the 30 busiest Spanish airports in 2013, from AENA statistics.

2012

The following is a list of the 30 busiest Spanish airports in 2012, from AENA statistics.

2011

The following is a list of the 30 busiest Spanish airports in 2011, from AENA statistics.

References

Spain
.x
S
Busiest

it:Aeroporti più trafficati in Europa
tr:Yolcu trafiğine göre Avrupa'nın en kalabalık havalimanları listesi